Antonia Balek (born 29 May 1968 in Split) is a Paralympian athlete from Croatia competing mainly in F52 shot put and discus throw events.

She competed in the 2008 Summer Paralympics in Beijing, China. There she won a gold medal in both the women's shot put F32–34/52–53 event and F33–34/52–53 javelin throw event.

External links
 
 Beijing results

Paralympic athletes of Croatia
Athletes (track and field) at the 2008 Summer Paralympics
Paralympic gold medalists for Croatia
Living people
1968 births
Sportspeople from Split, Croatia
World record holders in Paralympic athletics
Medalists at the 2008 Summer Paralympics
Paralympic medalists in athletics (track and field)
Croatian female javelin throwers
Croatian female shot putters
21st-century Croatian women
20th-century Croatian women